

References

Anoles
Reptiles described in 2004
Endemic fauna of Cuba
Reptiles of Cuba
Taxa named by Orlando H. Garrido